The 2012 UCI Women's Road World Cup was the 15th edition of the UCI Women's Road World Cup. The calendar was to retain the same races as the 2011 edition, with the only change being the rescheduling of the Ronde van Drenthe to be the first race, until the GP Ciudad de Valladolid was cancelled for financial reasons. Annemiek van Vleuten was the defending champion.

Marianne Vos secured her fourth World Cup when she finished in third place at the Open de Suède Vårgårda, which gave her a sufficient points lead to ensure her victory regardless of the placings in the following week's final race, the Grand Prix de Plouay, which she also won.



Races
Source:

Final points standings

Individuals 
Source:

Teams

References

External links
Official site

 
UCI Women's Road World Cup
UCI Women's Road World Cup